Achill Rovers F.D.A.C. is an Irish association football club based in Achill Island, County Mayo. The club was founded in 1986 following the merger of Achill United F.C. and Achill Eagles A.D.F.C.. Its senior men's team competes in the Mayo Association Football League. In July 2015 Achill Rovers were named the Aviva Club of the Year by the FAI.

History

Early years
In 1974 Achill United was formed by Fr. Vincent O'Brien. Achill Rovers home ground is named after Fr. O'Brien. In August 1979 Achill Eagles Athletic Drama & Football Club was formed during a meeting in the Minaun Bar. Both clubs were moderately successful junior clubs. However, by 1986 it was clear that in order for an Achill team to remain competitive a merger would be necessary. By the end of the 1985–86 season both Achill United and Achill Eagles were finding it difficult to field full sides. At a meeting in the Slievemore Hotel on 21 April 1986 it was decided to amalgamate the two clubs as Achill Rovers.

Mayo champions
In 1997 and 1998 Achill Rovers finished as runners up and then champions of the Mayo Association Football League. Despite finishing the 1998 season as champions, Achill Rovers subsequently found themselves relegated following a reorganization of the Mayo League. In the addition to renaming the top division the Super League, the league also introduced new criteria for home grounds and facilities. Achill Rovers failed to match the required standards and as result the club found itself excluded from the revamped league.

Achill Rovers on Radio
In 2014 RTÉ Radio 1's The John Murray Show announced that they were going to follow and support Achill Rovers as their underdogs during the 2014 season. Packie Bonner was appointed celebrity coach for the show. In August 2014, Achill Rovers also featured in the BBC Radio 4 documentary series Crossing Continents. The episode focused on immigration from Ireland and the importance of sport in rural communities. The programme featured  interviews with Enda Kenny and with players and officials from Achill Rovers, Achill GFC and  Kilmeena GAA.

Joseph N'Do
In February 2015 Joseph N'Do joined Achill Rovers as a part-time coach, initially working with the U13 and U12 boys, U14 and U12 girls teams and the men's junior team. In January 2016 it was announced that N'Do had also registered with Rovers as a player.
In March 2017, the club signed another international player, Togolese striker, Cyril Guedjé.

Aviva Club of the Year 
In July 2015 Achill Rovers were named the Aviva Club of the Year by the FAI and were presented with the award by John Delaney. After being nominated in the participation category Achill Rovers received a cheque of €1,500. They won the award for increasing membership numbers, despite a falling population, and building a club that is open to all the community, actively encouraging new residents to become involved in all aspects of club life. Achill Rovers received a cheque for €5,000 as the overall winners.

Grounds
Achill Rovers play their home games at Fr. O'Brien Park. They have also played home games at the  Currane Community Sports Field.

Gallery

Squad

Honours
Mayo Association Football League
Winners: 1998
Runners Up: 1997
Aviva FAI Club of the Year
Winners: 2015

References

Association football clubs in County Mayo
Association football clubs established in 1986
1986 establishments in Ireland
Achill Island